Feelings is a 1974 British drama film directed by Gerry O'Hara and starring Kate O'Mara, Paul Freeman and Edward Judd. Its plot concerns a couple who are unable to conceive a baby and attempt artificial insemination.

Cast
 Kate O'Mara as Barbara Martin
 Paul Freeman as Paul Martin
 Edward Judd as Doctor Benson
 Bob Sherman as Michael
 Frances Kearney as Helen Randall
 Ronan O'Casey as John Roberts
 Beth Porter as Mrs. Lustig
 Diane Fletcher as Renate 
 Felicity Devonshire as Carrie 
 Freda Bamford as Barbara's Mother 
 Melissa Stribling as Charlotte Randall 
 David Markham as Professor Roland
 Sally Faulkner as Mrs. Linden 
 Rikki Howard as Michael's Girlfriend 
 Jean Gilpin as Receptionist

References

External links

1974 films
1974 drama films
Films directed by Gerry O'Hara
British drama films
1970s English-language films
1970s British films